The Man in Black 1959–1962 is the third box set released by Bear Family Records. It contains 5 CDs of Johnny Cash's music. The first four discs include many well-known and rare songs, as well as some outtakes. Disc 5 is completely outtakes of seven songs.

Track listing

Credits
Mastered by – Duncan Cowell
Producer – Don Law, Jack Clement
Reissue producer – Colin Escott, Richard Weize

References
Bear Family Records
Discogs entry

1991 compilation albums
Johnny Cash compilation albums
Bear Family Records compilation albums